Hard Metal was a Yugoslav music magazine, notable as the first magazine in the country dedicated entirely to heavy metal music.

History
Hard Metal was published by Novi Sad publishing company Dnevnik. The Editor-in-Chiefs was Konstantin Polzović. The first issue of Hard Metal was released in May 1991, and the last, sixth issue was released in May 1992.

In 1992, Hard Metal joined with another music magazine published by Dnevnik, Bum. The new magazine was entitled Rock Starz, and only three issues were published, after which, due to hyperinflation in FR Yugoslavia, the magazine ceased to exist.

Sections
The magazine featured reviews of new hard rock and heavy metal releases, interviews and concert reviews, covering international, as well as Yugoslav heavy metal scene. Hard Metal published exclusive interviews with the members of W.A.S.P., Megadeth, Metallica, Guns N' Roses, Bon Jovi, Skid Row, and others.

References

Music magazines published in Serbia
Serbian rock music
Yugoslav rock music
Heavy metal publications
Magazines established in 1991
Magazines disestablished in 1992
Serbian-language magazines
Defunct magazines published in Yugoslavia
Mass media in Novi Sad
1991 establishments in Yugoslavia
1992 disestablishments in Yugoslavia
Bi-monthly magazines